Bill Heid (born August 11, 1948) is an American jazz pianist and organist from Pittsburgh, Pennsylvania.

Discography
 This Is My Rifle (Westside, 1994 [1996])
 Bop Rascal (Savant, 1996 [1997])
 Bassett Hound with Johnnie Bassett (Fedora, 1996 [1997])
 Wet Streets (Savant, 1997 [1999])
 Dark Secrets (Savant, 1998 [2000])
 We Play the Blues with Johnnie Bassett (Black Magic, 2000)
 Da Girl (Savant, 2000 [2003]) 
 Air Mobile (Doodlin', 2006)
 Asian Persuasion (Doodlin', 2008)
 Wylie Avenue (Doodlin', 2009)
 The Happiness of Pursuit with Henry Franklin (Skipper, 2015)
 Dealin' Wid It (Savant, 2019 [2022])

References

1948 births
Living people
American jazz pianists
American male pianists
American jazz keyboardists
Soul-jazz pianists
Hard bop pianists
Soul-jazz keyboardists
Hard bop organists
Jazz-blues pianists
Jazz-blues keyboardists
20th-century American pianists
21st-century American keyboardists
21st-century American pianists
21st-century organists
20th-century American male musicians
21st-century American male musicians
American male jazz musicians